Fan Hengbo (born 14 July 1999) is a Chinese footballer currently playing as a forward for Guangzhou.

Career statistics

Club
.

References

1999 births
Living people
Chinese footballers
China youth international footballers
Association football forwards
China League One players
Chinese Super League players
Guangzhou F.C. players
Inner Mongolia Zhongyou F.C. players
21st-century Chinese people